Sopo may refer to:

 Sopó, a town in Colombia
 Sopo (structure), a storage or granary structure in Batak Toba culture
 Sopo River, a river in South Sudan
 Sopo, Portugal, a town in Portugal

See also 
 Korean cannon—for "so-po"